Tosetti is a surname. Notable people with the surname include:

Gilbert Tosetti (1879–1923), English cricketer
Matteo Tosetti (born 1992), Swiss footballer

See also
Tonetti